Norris Glacier is a glacier flowing eastward between Kennedy Glacier and Mount Darby into the upper part of Matterhorn Glacier in Asgard Range, Victoria Land. Named by New Zealand Geographic Board (NZGB) (1998) after Baden Norris, Honorary Curator of the Antarctic collection, Canterbury Museum; historian who worked in Antarctica as a conservator of historic huts.

Glaciers of the Asgard Range
McMurdo Dry Valleys